Oceanobacillus pacificus is a gram positive, rod shaped, halophilic bacteria of the family Bacillaceae. Oceanobacillus pacificus species was isolated from deep-sea sediment core of the South Pacific Gyre and from marine sponge of Saint Martin's island of the Bay of Bengal, Bangladesh. The type strain is XH204T ( = DSM 25873T = JCM 18381T).

References 

Bacillaceae
Gram-positive bacteria